Events in the year 1978 in Portugal.

Incumbents
President: António Ramalho Eanes
Prime Minister: Mário Soares (until 28 August), Alfredo Nobre da Costa (from 28 August to 22 November), Carlos Mota Pinto (from 22 November)

Events
 23 January - Establishment of the II Constitutional Government of Portugal.
 29 August - Establishment of the III Constitutional Government of Portugal.
 22 November - Establishment of the IV Constitutional Government of Portugal.

Culture
Portugal participated in the Eurovision Song Contest 1978 with Gemini and the song "Dai li dou".

Sports
In association football, for the first-tier league seasons, see 1977–78 Primeira Divisão and 1978–79 Primeira Divisão.
Establishment of the 1ª Divisão de Andebol Feminino.
Establishment of the Portuguese Handball Third Division.
17 and 24 June - 1978 Taça de Portugal Final

References

 
Portugal
Years of the 20th century in Portugal
Portugal